The Catholic Church in Estonia (a Baltic former Soviet republic, like Latvia and Lithuania) presently comprises only a pre-diocesan Latin rite jurisdiction, covering (only) the entire country :
 Apostolic Administration of Estonia, obviously not warranting a national episcopal conference, nor partaking in any more regional assembly then the EU-broad Commissio Episcopatuum Communitatis Europææ (COM.E.C.E.).

There are no Eastern Catholic or other Latin prelatures.

There formally is an Apostolic Nunciature (papal diplomatic representation, embassy-level) to Estonia, but it's vested (like that to Latvia) in the Apostolic Nunciature to Lithuania in its national capital Vilnius.

Defunct Latin jurisdictions 
There are no titular sees.

None of the following has a current direct successor in Estonia, some (at least canonically) one abroad.

Suppressed Livonian prince-bishoprics  
 Diocese of Dorpat
 Diocese of Ösel–Wiek (alias Saare-Lääne; also known after successive sees as Leal (Lihula) from 1234, Perona (Vana-Pärnu) from 1251, Hapsal (Haapsalu) from 1279)

Suppressed non-princely Latin sees 
 Diocese of Inflanty alias Wenden
 Diocese of Leal
 Diocese of Pärnu = Pernau (1251-1263)
 Diocese of Reval
 Diocese of Virumaa = Wierland (1220-1227)

See also 
 List of Catholic dioceses (structured view)
 Roman Catholicism in Estonia

Sources and external links 
 GCatholic 

Estonia
Catholic dioceses